Adams Bluff is a bluff standing  north of Peters Peak in the Holyoake Range of the Churchill Mountains. Mapped by the United States Geological Survey (USGS) from tellurometer surveys and Navy air photos, 1960–62. Named by Advisory Committee on Antarctic Names (US-ACAN) for Paul L. Adams, United States Antarctic Research Program (USARP) meteorologist at Byrd Station, 1961–62, 1962–63, and at McMurdo Station, 1963–64, 1964–65.

Cliffs of Oates Land